Tristan Moran (born 15 August 1983 in Blenheim, New Zealand) is a rugby union footballer who plays as a prop for Bay of Plenty Steamers in the ITM Cup and the Hurricanes and Chiefs in Super Rugby.

References

External links
Hurricanes profile
Bay of Plenty profile
itsrugby.co.uk profile

Living people
New Zealand rugby union players
Hurricanes (rugby union) players
Chiefs (rugby union) players
Tasman rugby union players
Bay of Plenty rugby union players
Rugby union players from Blenheim, New Zealand
Rugby union props
1983 births
People educated at St Bede's College, Christchurch